DQV may refer to:
 Dragon Quest V: Hand of the Heavenly Bride, a video game.
 DQV star, a type of pulsating white dwarf star.